Dejana Radanović (born 14 May 1996) is a Serbian tennis player.

Radanović has won nine singles titles and two doubles titles on the ITF Women's Circuit. On 2 July 2018, she reached her best singles ranking of world No. 187. On 14 June 2021, she peaked at No. 398 in the WTA doubles rankings.

She made her WTA Tour main-draw debut through qualification at 2018 Nürnberger Versicherungscup, losing in the first round to two-time defending champion Kiki Bertens.

Radanović has represented Serbia in the Fed Cup, where she has a win–loss record of 2–3.

Performance timelines

Only main-draw results in WTA Tour, Grand Slam tournaments, Fed Cup/Billie Jean King Cup and Olympic Games are included in win–loss records.

Singles
Current through the 2022 Australian Open.

ITF Circuit finals

Singles: 17 (9 titles, 8 runner–ups)

Doubles: 3 (2 titles, 1 runner–up)

References

External links
 
 
 

1996 births
Living people
Sportspeople from Zrenjanin
Serbian female tennis players